"Siesta" is one of the best known poems of Shampa Sinha, the Indian born Australian poet. The poem won First Prize in the Fifth All India Poetry Competition conducted by The Poetry Society (India) in 1993. The poem was the second major award winning work of Shampa Sinha after she won the Best Young Poet award at the Third National Poetry Competition in 1991 for the poem "The Difference".

Excerpts from the poem

After lunch
when the files had ceased buzzing
over the food-littered floor
and the air was still and heavy
when only the soft plop
of drops from a leaky tap
broke the quiet

 *****

my wrinkled grandmother
would ask me to comb
her long wet hair
and as the comb furrowed
through the dark shining mass
and the smell of her coconut hair oil

 *****

her lips would tell me
of how an illiterate peasant
had obtained the gift of rhymes
from the Goddess Saraswati
of how the new-born Krishna
escaped the wrath of a jealous king

 *****

I would look on
with sleep-drunk eyes
as she recited Sanskrit verse
in a grating sandpapery voice

and when her eyes closed in comfort
and her breathing became as rhythmic
as the poetry she had chanted
through the long lazy afternoon,

I would tiptoe
Up to the old wall clock
to see

if time had stopped.

Comments and criticism
Shampa Sinha wrote the poem when she was a 15-year-old high school student. The poem has received positive reviews since its first publication in 1994 in the book Voices of the Future. The poem has been frequently quoted in scholarly analysis of contemporary Indian English poetry. The poem is regarded by critics as a jewel in contemporary Indian poetry.

See also
The Poetry Society (India)

Notes

External links
| First National Poetry Competition 1988 - Award Winners
| Liberation Magazine - L'Art de la Sieste
| India Writes - Contemporary Indian Poetry
"Best Indian Poems"

Indian English poems
1988 poems
Works originally published in Indian magazines
Works originally published in literary magazines